Muko may refer to:
 Mukō, Kyoto, Japan
 The Mukogawa River
 Muko Jima, Bonin Islands, Japan
 Muko Station, a railway station on the Hakubi Line in Kōfu, Tottori Prefecture, Japan
 Muko, Rwanda in Gikongoro District, Rwanda
 Muko, Uganda in Kabale District, Uganda